Anthony Marra (born 1984) is an American fiction writer. Marra has won numerous awards for his short stories, as well as his first novel, A Constellation of Vital Phenomena, which was a New York Times best seller.

Personal life
Marra was born in Washington, D.C., attended high school in Bethesda, Maryland, and has lived in Eastern Europe, though he now resides in Oakland, California.

Education
Marra attended the Landon School in Bethesda, Maryland before attending the University of Southern California where he earned with bachelor's degree in creative writing. He received a Master of Fine Arts degree from the Iowa Writer's Workshop. Between 2011 and 2013, he was a Stegner Fellow at Stanford University, where he also taught as the Jones Lecturer in Fiction. 

Marra has also received fellowships from the John Simon Guggenheim Memorial Foundation and the National Endowment for the Arts.

Writing
Marra has contributed pieces to The Atlantic, Narrative Magazine, Granta, The Rumpus, New York Times, The Washington Post, Wall Street Journal, and The New Republic.

Accolades

Bibliography

Essays 

 "Giving Up," published July 7, 2011 in The Rumpus 
 "When a Sentence Changes Your Life—Then Changes Its Own Meaning," published May 7, 2013 in The Atlantic

Short stories 
 "Chechnya," published in 2009 in Narrative Magazine
"The Wolves of Bilaya Forest," May 31, 2012 by The Atlantic
"The Lion's Den" (2019)
"Lipari," published April 25, 2017 in Granta

Contributor 

 xo Orpheus: Fifty New Myths, published September 24, 2013 by Penguin Books
 The Best American Nonrequired Reading 2016, published October 4, 2016 by Mariner Books

Books 
 A Constellation of Vital Phenomena, published May 7, 2013 by Random House
 The Tsar of Love and Techno: Stories, published October 6, 2015 by Hogarth Press 
Mercury Pictures Presents, published August 2, 2022 by Hogarth Press

References

External links
Anthony Marra (Official Website)
Profile at The Whiting Foundation

American male writers
1984 births
Living people
University of Southern California alumni
Stanford University Department of English faculty
Iowa Writers' Workshop alumni
Stegner Fellows
Writers from Oakland, California
Writers from Maryland
Writers from Washington (state)
Writers from Washington, D.C.